The 2018 World University Wrestling Championships were the 13th edition of World University Wrestling Championships of combined events and were held from 4 to 9 September in Goiânia, Brazil.

Turkey claimed 10 gold medals, 1 silver medal and 4 bronze medals. In total 12 nations participated in this event.

Medal table

Team ranking

Medal summary

Men's freestyle

Men's Greco-Roman

Women's freestyle

Participating nations 
139 competitors from 12 nations participated.

 (3)
 (22)
 (3)
 (15)
 (6)
 (11)
 (23)
 (15)
 (12)
 (12)
 (2)
 (15)

References 
2018 in sport wrestling

World University Wrestling Championships